TV Nova is a commercial television station in the Czech Republic. It began broadcasting in February 1994 as the first privately held nationwide Czech TV station. Its first CEO was Vladimír Železný. It quickly achieved the largest market share in the country and remained in this position until the early 2010s.

History
During the 1990s, Nova produced a number of comedy shows, featuring actors like Jiří Lábus and Oldřich Kaiser. The channel also created its own quiz show.

The channel attracted some notoriety for its late-night nude weather reports ("Počasíčko"), in which a female (and later male) presenter would appear naked to present the weather. The presenter would then put on clothes appropriate to the weather being forecast.

Disputes between broadcasting license holder CET 21 and financial supplier CME resulted in an international arbitration (CME/Lauder v. Czech Republic) which ended with the Czech Republic forced to pay CME compensation of 353 million USD (approx. 10 billion CZK).

Vladimír Železný sold CET 21 to the financial group PPF of Petr Kellner, and today TV Nova is owned by CME. The current CEOs are Klára Brachtlová and Jan Vlček.

Nova HD
Since October 2008, TV Nova is broadcast in high definition quality via satellite, cable, and also a test airing via DVB-T is in progress. Currently the signal is broadcast in 1920×1080i with a bitrate of 18Mbit/s.

Sister channels

Programming

Czech series
 Ulice
 Kriminálka Anděl Mondays 20:00–21:00
 Soukromé pasti ("Private Traps")
 Ordinace v růžové zahradě 2 ("Doctor's office in rose garden 2")
 Pojišťovna štěstí ("Insurance company of luck")
 Comeback
 Nováci Every day from September 1995 to April 1996; sometimes reprised
 Draculův švagr Horror series, which ran short time in 1996
 Robinsonův ostrov Reality series, Czech version of Survivor

Past
 DO-RE-MI (1998–2004)

Periodical shows

Title Tipy ptáka Loskutáka (Tips of the bird Gracula) is the teleshopping part of Rady ptáka Loskutáka. Law regulation compel different names.

Logos

CME Content Academy
In 2022, TV Nova and Markíza launched the CME Content Academy, in cooperation with the Brno Television Institute. The scholarship program is funded by Central European Media Enterprises, to which both TV Nova and Markíza belong. The academy's two-year course is a professional training course designed to provide participants with a grounding across various film-making disciplines.

The training is based around the production schedules of TV Nova and Markíza and takes place in Brno, Prague and Bratislava.

See also
 List of original shows by TV Nova

References

External links

  Official Site
  TN.cz

1994 establishments in the Czech Republic
Central European Media Enterprises
Nova
Nova
Nova
Czech-language television stations

Television broadcasting companies of the Czech Republic